Magnetic fluid may refer to:
Magnetorheological fluid, a fluid that changes viscosity when subjected to a magnetic field
Ferrofluid, a strongly paramagnetic fluid
Animal magnetism, a supposed invisible natural force possessed by all living things